Karel Kolesa (born 31 December 1942) is a Czech rower. He competed in two events at the 1968 Summer Olympics.

References

1942 births
Living people
Czech male rowers
Olympic rowers of Czechoslovakia
Rowers at the 1968 Summer Olympics
Sportspeople from Brno